Dale L. Wright (born 1950 or 1951) is an American politician. He is a member of the Missouri House of Representatives from the 116th District, serving since 2019. He is a member of the Republican party.

Electoral history

References

Living people
1950s births
Republican Party members of the Missouri House of Representatives
21st-century American politicians